Marmalade Skies is an online auction site that offers flyers a chance to bid on empty leg flights and make flight requests for on-demand private jet travel. The company also sells seats on scheduled Part-135 qualified piston and Turboprop aircraft plus offers last minute deals on regional airlines.

The company was founded in 2013 by Chuck Taylor and Brad Reisner who also is the co-founder of Charitybuzz.

History

Marmalade Skies was born from an observation that the on demand air charter industry is a surprisingly inefficient business model for both passengers and charter companies – up to 40% of the private jet flights jetting across the sky are empty.

The company has created a community of travelers and charter operators using an auction-based mode and the market has become more transparent, more honest, and more efficient.

Marmalade Skies gives fliers a chance to bid on and buy luxury private jet travel and save – while giving charter companies a chance to grow their businesses.

Services

 Empty Legs: flight auctions
 Private Jet Charters: flight auctions
 Flash Seats: last minute seat deals on board a piston, turbo prop or regional jet

Frequently Chartered Private Jets

Gulfstream GV
World Class Worldwide
Passengers: 14
Max Range: 5,800 nm
Max Cruise Speed: 670 mph

Gulfstream G450
World Class Worldwide
Passengers: 14
Max Range: 4,200 nm
Max Cruise Speed: 650 mph

Gulfstream GIV
World Class Worldwide
Passengers: 12
Max Range: 4,220 nm
Max Cruise Speed: 640 mph

Citation X
Fastest Passenger Jet in the World
Passengers: 8
Max Range: 3,000 nm
Max Cruise Speed: 700 mph

Lear 60
Speed, Comfort, and Style
Passengers: 7
Max Range: 2,400 nm
Max Cruise Speed: 536 mph

Beechjet 400A
Lightweight Powerhouse
Passengers: 7
Max Range: 1400 nm
Max Cruise Speed: 535 mph

Citation V
High Capacity, High efficiency
Passengers: 8
Max Range: 1,600 nm
Max Cruise Speed: 570 mph

Citation CJ2
Performance, Comfort and Value
Passengers: 6
Max Range: 1300 nm
Max Cruise Speed: 460 mph

Phenom 100
Efficient Business Luxury
Passengers: 4
Max Range: 1100 nm
Max Cruise Speed: 449 mph

References

External links 
 

Online auction websites of the United States
Deal of the day services
Companies based in Westport, Connecticut
American companies established in 2013
Internet properties established in 2013